Pterostylis lepida, commonly known as the Halbury greenhood is a plant in the orchid family Orchidaceae and is endemic to South Australia. Both flowering and non-flowering plants have a rosette of leaves. Flowering plants have up to ten green flowers with brown and translucent striations and a small, insect-like labellum. It is only known from two small populations.

Description
Flowering plants have a rosette at the base of the flowering stem but the leaves are usually withered by flowering time. Flowering occurs from August to November.

Taxonomy and naming
The Halbury greenhood was first formally described in 2009 by David Jones and given the name Oligochaetochilus lepidus from a specimen collected near Halbury. It had previously been known as Pterostylis sp. 'Halbury'. The description was published in The Orchadian. In 2010, Gary Backhouse changed the name to Pterostylis lepida. The specific epithet (lepida) is a Latin word meaning "pleasant", "elegant" or "fine".

Distribution and habitat
Pterostylis lepida grows in mallee woodland with a dense shrub layer on plains. It is found in two small populations near Halbury and Moonta.

Conservation
Pterostylis lepida is listed as "endangered" under the Australian Government Environment Protection and Biodiversity Conservation Act 1999. The main threats to the species are weed invasion, especially by bearded oat and brome, grazing by rabbits and trampling.

References

lepida
Endemic orchids of Australia
Orchids of South Australia
Plants described in 2009